Juan Morales Rodríguez (born 1 October 1909, date of death unknown) was a Mexican long-distance runner who competed in the 1932 Summer Olympics.

References

1909 births
Year of death missing
Mexican male long-distance runners
Olympic athletes of Mexico
Athletes (track and field) at the 1932 Summer Olympics
Central American and Caribbean Games gold medalists for Mexico
Central American and Caribbean Games silver medalists for Mexico
Competitors at the 1935 Central American and Caribbean Games
Central American and Caribbean Games medalists in athletics
20th-century Mexican people